The 314th Infantry Regiment is an infantry regiment of the U.S. Army first organized in 1917.

History

World War I
Organized as part of the 79th Division A.E.F. (American Expeditionary Force) – World War I The United States in World War I, the men of the 314th were trained at Camp Meade (later renamed Fort George G. Meade in 1929), Maryland. Arriving at the camp in September, 1917, the unit was included in the 157th Infantry Brigade of Brigadier General William Jones Nicholson, along with the 313th Infantry Regiment and the 311th Machine Gun Battalion. Upon arrival at Brest, France, they continued training until September 1918, then took part in the Meuse Argonne Offensive. Capturing the town of Malancourt on 26 September 1918, they assisted the 313th Infantry on the following day in the capture of the town of Montfaucon-d'Argonne. Montfaucon was a heavily defended area and observation post of the German army. Of the four Infantry regiments of the 79th Division involved in the offensive, the 314th was hardest-hit. It took several days to account for all the missing personnel and bring the regiment up 50 percent manning.

The 79th Division was relieved on 30 September and transferred to the Troyon sector. While there, they assumed a variety of duties, including holding the front. They shared the trenches with the 313th, 315th, and 316th Infantry Regiments. During this time, they were harassed with mustard gas, shelling, and enemy trench and air raids but held the line.

At the end of October, the 79th Division was again ordered to move to participate in the third phase of the Meuse Argonne Offensive. On 1 November 1918, the 314th advanced. By 9 November, they captured the towns of Crepion, Waville, and Moirey. The following day the unit captured Buisson Chaumont, Hill 328. On 11 November, the 314th advanced against Cote de Romagne and stopped firing at 11 a.m., at the time of the Armistice. By the end day, the 314th had made the greatest advance into German lines east of the Meuse River.

Arriving at Hoboken, New Jersey on 26 May 1919, they were discharged from service at Camp Dix, New Jersey.

World War II

History of the Log Cabin 

Erected at Camp Meade, Maryland in 1917 by the men of the 314th as an Officers' Club and assembly room, it was purchased from the U.S. government after the war, carefully disassembled, and rebuilt on ground provided by the Washington Memorial Chapel by members of the Regiment. Dedicated in 1922 by the Veterans of the 314th A.E.F. to honor the 362 men of the Regiment who made the supreme sacrifice. The cabin housed artifacts of the 314th which allowed a glimpse at how life was for the men during the First World War. The centerpiece of the cabin was a bronze tablet listing all the members of the regiment—more than 4,000 names. A star was placed beside each name upon their death as a sign of honor. In 2012 the cabin was disassembled, gifted to the US Army and returned to Ft George G. Meade, MD. It remains in storage currently awaiting reconstruction. The contents of the cabin were likewise donated to the Ft Meade Museum.

314th Infantry Regiment A.E.F. website

Lineage
 Constituted 5 August 1917 in the National Army (USA) as the 314th Infantry and assigned to the 79th Division
 Organized in August 1917 at Camp Meade, Maryland
 Demobilized 29 May 1919 at Camp Dix, New Jersey
 Reconstituted 24 June 1921 in the Organized Reserves as the 314th Infantry and assigned to the 79th Division (later redesignated as the 79th Infantry Division)
 Organized in November 1921 with headquarters at Reading, Pennsylvania
 Ordered into active military service 15 June 1942 and reorganized at Camp Pickett, Virginia
 Inactivated 15 December 1945 at Camp Kilmer, New Jersey
 Activated 2 January 1947 in the Organized Reserves with headquarters at Pittsburgh, Pennsylvania
 (Organized Reserves redesignated 25 March 1948 as the Organized Reserve Corps; redesignated 9 July 1952 as the Army Reserve)
 Reorganized 6 April 1959 as a parent regiment under the Combat Arms Regimental System to consist of the 1st Battle Group, an element of the 79th Infantry Division
 Reorganized 7 January 1963 to consist of the 1st Battalion, an element of the 157th Infantry Brigade
 1st Battalion inactivated 1 September 1995 and relieved from assignment to the 157th Infantry Brigade
 314th Infantry withdrawn 17 October 1999 from the Combat Arms Regimental System(Training Support); 1st, 2d, and 3d Battalions concurrently allotted to the Regular Army

Distinctive unit insignia
 Description
A gold color metal and enamel device  in height overall consisting of a shield blazoned: Azure upon a mount Proper a falcon close Or within an orle of the last, in bordure three fleurs-de-lis of the like. Attached below the shield a Blue scroll inscribed "FORTITUDE AND COURAGE" in Gold letters. 
 Symbolism
The 314th Infantry was organized at Camp Meade as a unit of the 79th Division in 1917. It served overseas during World War I and took part in the Meuse-Argonne operation and held a sector in Lorraine. Under authority of the National Defense Act the regiment was reconstituted a unit of the 79th Division, Organized Reserves, in November 1921, with headquarters at Reading, Pennsylvania. The falcon recalls Montfaucon and the three fleurs-de-lis recall the regiment's first service in the Meuse-Argonne, the Troyon Sector and the second service in the Meuse-Argonne. 
 Background
The distinctive unit insignia was originally approved for the 314th Infantry, Organized Reserves on 14 July 1924. It was amended to revise the symbolism of the design on 22 June 1970. On 3 September 1999 the insignia was redesignated with description updated for the 314th Regiment.

Coat of arms

Blazon
 Shield
Azure upon a mount Proper a falcon close Or within an orle of the last in bordure three fleurs-de-lis of the like. 
 Crest
That for the regiments and separate battalions of the Army Reserve: From a wreath Or and Azure, the Lexington Minute Man Proper. The statue of the Minute Man, Captain John Parker (H.H. Kitson, sculptor), stands on the common in Lexington, Massachusetts. 
Motto Fortitude and Courage.

Symbolism
 Shield
The 314th Infantry was organized at Camp Meade as a unit of the 79th Division in 1917. It served overseas during World War I and took part in the Meuse-Argonne operation and held a sector in Lorraine. Under authority of the National Defense Act the regiment was reconstituted a unit of the 79th Division, Organized Reserves, in November 1921, with headquarters at Reading, Pennsylvania. The falcon recalls Montfaucon and the three fleurs-de-lis recall the regiment's first service in the Meuse-Argonne, the Troyon Sector and the second service in the Meuse-Argonne. 
 Crest
The crest is that of the U.S. Army Reserve.

Background
The coat of arms was originally approved for the 314th Infantry, Organized Reserves on 2 May 1924. It was amended to withdraw the "Organized Reserves" from the designation and to delete the Organized Reserves' crest from the coat of arms for the 314th Infantry on 29 May 1959. On 22 June 1970 it was amended to reinstate the crest of the Army Reserve and revise the symbolism of the design. On 3 September 1999 the coat of arms was redesignated for the 314th Regiment.

Campaign participation credit
 World War I: Meuse-Argonne; Lorraine 1918
 World War II: Normandy; Northern France; Rhineland; Central Europe

Decorations
 French Croix de Guerre with Palm, World War II for NORMANDY TO PARIS
 French Croix de Guerre with Palm, World War II for PARROY FOREST
 French Fourragère in the colors of the Croix de Guerre, World War II
 1st Battalion additionally entitled to:
 Presidential Unit Citation (Army) for LA HAYE DU PUITS
 2d Battalion additionally entitled to:
 Presidential Unit Citation (Army) for FORT DU ROULE
 3d Battalion additionally entitled to:
 Presidential Unit Citation (Army) for MEURTHE RIVER

Notable members
Cliff Aberson, Company L in World War II

References

Sources
 The 314th Infantry Regiment 79th Division Vol. I and Vol. II.  – compiled by Roy Rentz.
 History of the 79th Division, A.E.F.  – published by Steinman and Steinman, Lancaster, PA.
 American Armies And Battlefields in Europe  – by Center of Military History-United States Army.
 79th Division-Summary of Operations in World War One  – by The American Battle Monuments Commission.
 
 http://www.history.army.mil/html/forcestruc/lineages/branches/regt/0314rgt.htm

External links
The WW2 Letters of Private Melvin W. Johnson of the 314th Infantry Regiment, 79th Division

314
Military units and formations established in 1917